Yinan is a county in the south of Shandong province, China. It is under the administration of the prefecture-level city of Linyi.

Administrative divisions
Towns:
Jiehu, Andi, Sunzu, Shuanghou, Qingtuo, Zhangzhuang, Zhuanbu, Gegou, Yangjiapo, Dazhuang, Xinji, Puwang, Hutou, Sucun, Tongjing, Yiwen

The only township is Mamuchi Township

Climate

Notable people
 Zhuge Liang (181-234 AD), inventor, and strategist under the Shu Han state during the Three Kingdoms period in China.
 Chen Guangcheng (born 1971, in Dongshigu Village, Shuanghou town), human rights defender (under unofficial house arrest in 2011-2012, his six-year-old daughter not being allowed to attend school).

References

External links 
 Official homepage

Counties of Shandong
Linyi